Deolali is a village in the Karmala taluka of Solapur district in Maharashtra state, India.

Demographics
Covering  and comprising 703 households at the time of the 2011 census of India, Deolali had a population of 3629. There were 1884 males and 1745 females, with 474 people being aged six or younger.

References

Villages in Karmala taluka